Waitangi (  or) is a locality on the north side of the Waitangi River in the Bay of Islands, 60 kilometres north of Whangarei, on the North Island of New Zealand. It is close to the town of Paihia, to which it is connected by a bridge near the mouth of the Waitangi River estuary. While Statistics New Zealand and NZ Post consider the southern boundary of Waitangi to be the river and estuary, with the area further south being part of Paihia, the area by Te Tī Bay, immediately south of the river, is sometimes referred to as part of Waitangi. 

"Waitangi" is a Māori-language name meaning "noisy waters" or "weeping waters", probably referring to the Haruru Falls on the Waitangi River.

The Treaty of Waitangi was first signed at Waitangi on 6 February 1840.  It is also the place where the Declaration of Independence of New Zealand was signed five years earlier, on 28 October 1835. This document was ratified by the British Crown the following year (1836).

History

Signing of Treaty of Waitangi

The Treaty of Waitangi proper began on 5 February 1840 when a public meeting was held on the grounds in front of James Busby's residence. Lieutenant Governor Hobson read a proposed document to the 300 or so European and Māori who were in attendance and then provided the Māori chiefs an opportunity to speak. Initially, a large number of chiefs (including Te Kemara, Rewa and Moka Te Kainga-mataa) spoke against accepting the Crown's proposition to rule over Aotearoa.  Later in the proceedings a few chiefs began to entertain the idea; amongst the more notable chiefs to support the Crown were Te Wharerahi, Pumuka, and the two Hokianga chiefs, Tāmati Wāka Nene and his brother Eruera Maihi Patuone.

The proceedings were ended and were to recommence on 7 February; however, a number of chiefs pressed to sign earlier. The Treaty of Waitangi was initially signed on 6 February 1840 in a marquee erected in the grounds of James Busby's house at Waitangi by representatives of the British Crown, the chiefs of the Confederation of the United Tribes of New Zealand, and other Māori tribal leaders, and subsequently by other Māori chiefs at other places in New Zealand. Not all of the chiefs chose to sign this document, with a number of chiefs either delaying or refusing to put pen to paper.

In 2007, researcher Brent Kerehona claimed that uncertainty has arisen over whether Ngapuhi chief Moka Te Kainga-mataa actually signed; despite his name appearing on this document. A close inspection of the Treaty document itself shows no evidence of a signature or 'mark' next to Moka's name (which is written as 'Te Tohu o Moka'). Kerehona elaborates by inferring that it is clear by the accounts of Colenso (1890) that not only did Moka clearly express his concerns about the Treaty's effects whilst at the meeting on February 5, but that the discussion that he had with the  Reverend Charles Baker, combined with Moka's final comment, should be taken into account.

The Treaty of Waitangi followed on from The Declaration of Independence (He Whakaputanga) but did not render it void.

Treaty Grounds

Waitangi Treaty Grounds has been open to the public since 1934. What is now called the 'Treaty House' was first occupied by James Busby, who acted as the British resident in New Zealand from 1832 until the arrival of William Hobson, and his wife Agnes Busby. The Treaty House was restored in the 1930s, in preparation for New Zealand Centenary in 1940, sparking the first emergence of the Treaty into Pākehā attention since the 19th century.

Te Whare Rūnanga, a carved Māori meeting house, was built near the Treaty House in 1939 and opened on 6 February 1940. The area of the whare is sometimes used as if it is a marae and referred to as the "upper marae", although it is not a true marae. There is a marae, Te Tii Waitangi, in Te Tī Bay on the south side of the Waitangi River that is sometimes referred to as the "lower marae".

Te Kōngahu Museum of Waitangi opened on the grounds in 2015. Another museum, Te Rau Aroha, opened in 2020.

Demographics
Statistics New Zealand describes Waitangi as a rural settlement. The settlement is part of the larger Puketona-Waitangi statistical area.

Waitangi had a population of 51 at the 2018 New Zealand census, a decrease of 15 people (−22.7%) since the 2013 census, and a decrease of 21 people (−29.2%) since the 2006 census. There were 39 households, comprising 30 males and 21 females, giving a sex ratio of 1.43 males per female. The median age was 39.2 years (compared with 37.4 years nationally), with 6 people (11.8%) aged under 15 years, 12 (23.5%) aged 15 to 29, 21 (41.2%) aged 30 to 64, and 9 (17.6%) aged 65 or older.

Ethnicities were 58.8% European/Pākehā, 35.3% Māori, 11.8% Asian, and 5.9% other ethnicities. People may identify with more than one ethnicity.

Although some people chose not to answer the census's question about religious affiliation, 52.9% had no religion, 35.3% were Christian, 11.8% were Hindu and 5.9% had Māori religious beliefs.

Of those at least 15 years old, 12 (26.7%) people had a bachelor's or higher degree, and 0 (0.0%) people had no formal qualifications. The median income was $33,200, compared with $31,800 nationally. 6 people (13.3%) earned over $70,000 compared to 17.2% nationally. The employment status of those at least 15 was that 27 (60.0%) people were employed full-time, 12 (26.7%) were part-time, and 0 (0.0%) were unemployed.

References

 Colenso, William (1890) The Authentic and Genuine History of the Signing of the Treaty of Waitangi, Published by the Government Printer, Wellington, in 1890, and reprinted by Capper Press, ChCh in 1971.

External links

 Waitangi Treaty Ground website
 Info on Waitangi 
 Biography of chief Moka Te Kainga-mataa; signatory to the Declaration of Independence, Hobson's Proclamations, and participant in the Treaty of Waitangi.

Far North District
History of the Northland Region
Populated places in the Northland Region
Bay of Islands
Treaty of Waitangi